Korzan (also Romanized as Korzān and Karzān; also known as Kūrzān) is a village in Korzan Rud Rural District, in the Central District of Tuyserkan County, Hamadan Province, Iran. At the 2006 census, its population was 628, in 204 families.

References 

Populated places in Tuyserkan County